Jan Macháček (born 15 February 1972 in Prague) is a former Czech rugby player. He is one of arguably the two most famous Czech rugby players, along with Martin Jágr. He played for Newport RFC and Pontypridd RFC in Wales, Sale Sharks in England, Clermont Auvergne in France as well as the Barbarians.

He is currently CEO and owner of Infonia s.r.o., a webdesign company.

Early life
He was born in Prague and started playing rugby on account of his father Dušan having played. The first team he played for was Czech outfit Slavia Prague.

International career
He played his final match on 16 December 2009 in a 17–5 win against Hong Kong in Prague, aged 37 years old.

References

External links
 Jan Macháček on slavia.rugby.cz
Jan Macháček on historyofnewport.co.uk
Jan Macháček on ponty.net
Jan Macháček  on ercrugby.com

1972 births
Living people
Czech rugby union players
Rugby union flankers
Rugby union number eights
Rugby union locks
Newport RFC players
Sale Sharks players
Pontypridd RFC players
ASM Clermont Auvergne players
Czech expatriate rugby union players
Expatriate rugby union players in England
Expatriate rugby union players in Wales
Expatriate rugby union players in France
Czech expatriate sportspeople in England
Czech expatriate sportspeople in France
Czech expatriate sportspeople in Wales
Sportspeople from Prague